The 1923 International Universities Championships was organised by the Union Nationale des Étudiants de France (UNEF) and held in Paris, France. Held from 3–6 May, ten nations were present in the men's only programme, which included athletics (18 events) and fencing (4 events).

Athletics medal summary

Medal table

Participating nations

References
World Student Games (Pre-Universiade) - GBR Athletics 

Athletics at the Summer Universiade
International University Championships
Athletics in Paris
International athletics competitions hosted by France
1923 in France